Gideon Bickel is an Israeli businessman. Bickel was the owner of Flora Stock Exchange in Belgium. He was chairman and owner of Carmel Agrexco.

Biography 

Bickel finished undergraduate studies in agronomy at the Hebrew University. He has several master degrees, and he holds a doctorate in social sciences from the University of Haifa. In addition, he graduated the National Security College with honors.

Bickel is a retired colonel (in reserve duty) in the IDF, a commander in the paratroopers and was wounded in Six Day war during the break to Jerusalem. He served in Yom Kippur war and in the first Lebanon war, in 1982.

Career 
Bickel began his business career in 1968 as a farmer and exporter of agricultural produce. In 1997 acquired Flora, the flower exchange in Belgium, which was sold after six years of operation to a Belgian shopping center. In 2011, Bickel purchased Agrexco, an agricultural export company. Under his directorship, the company was renamed Carmel Agrexco.

Bickel is the owner of Hadarim, a shopping mall in Netanya.

Public positions 

Bickel served in 1987 as a representative of Israel Bonds in the US and Canada. In 1989 he was the chairman of the agricultural strategy committee established by the Government of Israel, and was on the board of directors of Agridev, which developed and provided agricultural knowledge to countries around the world. Bickel is the founder and the first president of Bnei Arazim, a volunteer association for children's care. Bickel was a member of the Israel Export Institute.

Bickel served as a chairman of the agricultural committee to interaction between Israel and the Arabs of Judea, Samaria and the Gaza Strip.

Awards and recognition

Bickel won the 1989 Kaplan Award for Breakthrough in growing flowers for export. He has received a certificate of appreciation from the Chamber of Commerce for his contribution to the development of free enterprise and a certificate of appreciation from the Minister of Agriculture for his work in strategic agricultural planning.

References 

Date of birth missing (living people)
Israeli businesspeople
Israeli military personnel
Businesspeople in agriculture
Jewish peace activists
Living people
Year of birth missing (living people)